Wu Bei (born December 22, 1979) is a Chinese rhythmic gymnast.

Wu competed for China in the rhythmic gymnastics individual all-around competition at the 1996 Summer Olympics in Atlanta. There she was 35th in the qualification round and didn't advance to the semifinal.

References

External links 
 
 

1979 births
Living people
Chinese rhythmic gymnasts
Olympic gymnasts of China